Meertenwei is a hamlet in the Dutch province of Gelderland. It is a part of the municipality of Buren, and lies about 9 km northeast of Tiel.

Meertenwei is not a statistical entity, and the postal authorities have placed it under Lienden. The hamlet is located on a dead-end side street of the N320, and consists of about 10 houses.

References

Populated places in Gelderland
Buren